The 2008 Magny-Cours Superbike World Championship round was the thirteenth round of the 2008 Superbike World Championship. It took place on the weekend of October 3-5, 2008, at the Circuit de Nevers Magny-Cours.

Superbike race 1 classification

Superbike race 2 classification

Supersport race classification

Magny-Cours Round
Magny-Cours